The 7th Dáil was elected at the 1932 general election on 16 February 1932 and met on 9 March 1932. The members of Dáil Éireann, the house of representatives of the Oireachtas (legislature) of the Irish Free State, are known as TDs. The 7th Dáil was dissolved by Governor-General Domhnall Ua Buachalla, at the request of the President of the Executive Council Éamon de Valera on 2 January 1933. The 7th Dáil lasted  days. There were no by-elections during the 7th Dáil.

Composition of the 7th Dáil

Government party denoted with bullet

Graphical representation
This is a graphical comparison of party strengths in the 7th Dáil from March 1932. This was not the official seating plan.

Ceann Comhairle
On 9 March 1932, Frank Fahy (FF) was proposed by Gerald Boland and seconded by Donnchadh O hAllamhain for the position of Ceann Comhairle. Michael Hayes (CnaG), who had been Ceann Comhairle since 1922, was proposed by W. T. Cosgrave and seconded by Ernest Blythe for the position. Fahy was elected by a vote of 78 to 71.

TDs by constituency
The list of the 153 TDs elected, is given in alphabetical order by Dáil constituency.

Changes

References

External links
Houses of the Oireachtas: Debates: 7th Dáil

 
07
7th Dáil